The BTCC Masters was a one off race organised between TOCA director Alan J. Gow and SEAT. The race took place at Donington Park on September 26, 2004 at the end of the final race of the 2004 British Touring Car Championship season.

Race Concept
The idea of the race was to find the "BTCC Master"" from sixteen past and present drivers from the British Touring Car Championship. The total number of drivers was sixteen, the line up including eight former champions was the largest number of BTCC title winners to take place in one race. The rest of the grid was made up of race winners and former stars from the past twelve years. Only two drivers were unable to race, Yvan Muller and James Thompson due to their contracts with Vauxhall. Car numbers related to the year they won the BTCC championship, for example John Cleland in car number 95 because he won in 1995. With non championship winning drivers given single numbers. The drivers would all take two timed free practice sessions in the cars but the starting grid would be drawn randomly from a hat.

The cars were all identical SEAT Leon Cupra R's, as driven in the SEAT Cupra Championship which was part of the TOCA tour. As the cars were front wheel drive, older drivers such as Gravett and Sytner said they did struggle to drive as they were used to driving rear wheel drive touring cars. All cars were painted in the same grey colour except for SEAT driver Jason Plato, who drove a blue car.

Driver Grid
Below is a table which shows all the drivers who took place in the order they were drawn for their grid positions.

Overview

As all the drivers took their places on the grid and waited for the starting lights, Anthony Reid, who was on the front row, jumped the start as the lights were on red. Reid went forward a few feet and as he realised his error and stopped, the lights had gone green and he'd lost several places. On the whole, the race was fiercely contested by all competitors with much panel bashing throughout. This was evident as early as the second corner as Jason Plato pushed past Patrick Watts for second place sending him onto the grass and dropping him down the field. Making the most progress on the first lap was Tim Harvey. Starting in tenth, he'd managed to make his way up to third by the time the cars had started lap two. At the front the battle was between John Cleland and Plato. Plato took the lead on lap four but Cleland stayed close and got his place back again two laps later. On lap eight Plato forced his way up the inside of Cleland on the first corner. This sent Cleland wide and both Reid and Harvey also got by. While all this was happening at the front, Gabriele Tarquini had set the fastest lap time and had already overtaken half the field. The safety car was soon brought out for a lap purely to bunch up all the drivers again who by now were quite spread apart.
After the restart there was a new race leader as Reid forcefully got past Plato. Further behind as the cars came round the craner curves, Kelvin Burt was pushed by the group of drivers behind him off the track and hard side on into the tyre wall. It was a heavy collision but thankfully, Burt stepped out the car shaken but OK. As the cars were slowed down for the safety car, somehow Harvey and Johnny Cecotto managed to collide, sending both drivers into the gravel trap and out of the race.
When the race had restarted again, Alain Menu made a move past Plato as they went round the old hairpin. Menu knocked Plato on to the grass. He tried to keep the car in a straight line to get back on to the tarmac coming under Starkys bridge, but as he returned  to the track he drove straight in front of Watts. Watts had no chance to avoid and both wrecked cars spun off the circuit. By now Reid was clear in first place with Menu second. On the final lap the main battle was for third. Frank Biela had the position but the impressive Tarquini was now right behind him and managed to get side by side as they came under the Dunlop Bridge towards the final corner. At the finish, Reid took the chequered flag with Menu half a second behind. Tarquini had got ahead of Biela to take the final podium place. Just behind them Matt Neal took fifth and Cleland finished sixth in what was a thrilling race.

Final Positions

DVD release
Extensive highlights of the race along with post race reactions were available as an extra feature on the UK DVD of the British Touring Car Championship 2004 review.

External links
 Official SEAT Sport news

Touring car races
2004 in British motorsport
British Touring Car Championship